Nokia 5800 XpressMusic is a smartphone part of the XpressMusic line, announced by Nokia on 2 October 2008 in London and started shipping in November of that year. Code-named "Tube", it was the first touchscreen-equipped S60 device by Nokia – essentially it was the first device to run Symbian^1, also known as S60 5th Edition, the touch-specific S60-based platform created by the Symbian Foundation. The touchscreen features tactile feedback (though it does not use Nokia's Haptikos technology).

Nokia 5800 XpressMusic has a 3.2-inch display with a resolution of 640x360 pixels, and has many features standard to the Nokia Nseries, such as GPS, HSDPA and Wi-Fi support. It was a highly anticipated device in 2008 and went on to become a commercial success with 8 million units sold a year after release. It was praised for its supplied stylus and low price, but was viewed negative by critics for its camera and software issues.

History

The Nokia 5800 XpressMusic is not the first touchscreen device in Nokia's range. In 2004, the Nokia 7700 was announced, a Nokia Series 90 device that was cancelled before it reached the market. This was followed by the Nokia 7710 which was an upgraded version of the 7700 and became available during 2005. Nokia also produced the UIQ-based Nokia 6708 phone in 2005, but this was not an in-house development and was bought in from Taiwanese manufacturer BenQ. Nokia have also produced a range of Maemo-based Internet tablets which have a touchscreen interface, but are not mobile phones by themselves (one can connect and use a phone via Bluetooth). The 5800 is, however, Nokia's first Symbian S60 touchscreen device. The 16:9 aspect ratio display was the first among mobile phones. It has a compatibility mode for Java applications that are not touchscreen-aware. It works by using part of the screen for displaying the essential buttons required by the program.

The launch of the 5800 XpressMusic in January 2009 was followed-up with the release of the Nokia N97 in May and June 2009, followed by the Series 40 based Nokia 6208c in January 2009. The device, as well as the Nokia Music Store, launched in South Africa on 24 April 2009.

On the market, the Nokia 5800 XpressMusic would compete with other touchscreen devices such as Sony Ericsson Xperia X1, Sony Ericsson Satio, iPhone 3G, HTC Touch Diamond, LG Renoir, LG Arena (KM900), BlackBerry Storm 9500, Samsung Pixon and Samsung i900 Omnia.

In early February 2009 the website Mobile-Review.com, which was initially very enthusiastic about the handset, published its research and concluded that the Nokia 5800 had a design flaw. Specifically, when phones were used on a daily basis, their earpieces, produced for Nokia under contract by a third party, would cease to function in a very short time. Repairs performed under warranty would only temporarily fix the problem. The defect was found to be in the earpiece design. Nokia's public relations department had admitted that the Nokia 5800 XpressMusic contained this design defect. According to Nokia, they switched to another earpiece manufacturer, so all 5800's produced during February 2009 or later should be free from defect, with previously produced earpieces eligible for free warranty repair. New earpiece parts have also been supplied to Nokia service centres and future phone repairs should permanently fix the defect.

Navigation Edition
On 21 August 2009, Nokia announced a new variant named Nokia 5800 Navigation Edition. In addition to the normal Nokia 5800, it has the latest version of Nokia Maps pre-installed. It also comes with a car charger and car kit inside the box because the GPS decreases the battery life. Both the Nokia 5800 XpressMusic and the 5800 Navigation Edition, however, have free lifetime navigation, due to the new version of Ovi Maps.
The service was available at nokia.com.

Marketing
A prototype of this handset was seen in the 2008 Batman movie, The Dark Knight and a number of music videos such as Christina Aguilera's "Keeps Gettin' Better", "Womanizer" by Britney Spears, Flo Rida's "Right Round", Pitbull's "Shut It Down", The Pussycat Dolls' "Jai Ho!" and "Hush Hush", Katy Perry's "Waking Up in Vegas" and Cobra Starship's "Good Girls Go Bad".
The phone has received generally positive reviews, with UK phone magazine Mobile Choice awarding it a full 5 stars in its 7 January 2009 issue.

Sales
On 23 January 2009, Nokia announced it had shipped the millionth 5800 XpressMusic device, even though it still had not been fully released worldwide. Noknok reported by April that it was one of the fastest selling smartphones of all time. In Nokia's Q1 report released on 16 April 2009 it was announced the company had shipped 2.6 million units during the quarter, with cumulative shipments of more than 3 million units since the smartphone's launch. Q2 results released 16 July 2009 reports 3.7 million units shipped during the quarter and more than 6.8 million units total have shipped since the release. As of November 2009, over 8 million units had been sold.

Specifications 

Nokia 5800 XpressMusic has the following specifications:
 81-mm / 3.2-inch 16.7M TFT resistive touchscreen, 360 × 640 pixels resolution (16:9 display ratio).
 Dimensions:  111 × 51.7 × 15.5 mm, 83 cm3
 Weight: 109 g (incl. battery and sim card).
 S60 5th edition OS with touch input running Symbian OS v9.4
 Quad band GSM / GPRS / EDGE: GSM 850 / 900 / 1800 / 1900
 Dual band UMTS / HSDPA: UMTS 900 / 2100 (5800–1) or UMTS 850 / 1900 (5800-2 Latin America and Brazil variant)
 Stand-by time – Up to 406 hrs
 Integrated hands-free speakerphone
 Vibrating alert
 Accelerometer for auto screen rotation.
 3.2 MP AF Carl Zeiss lens, dual LED flash, 3x digital zoom and geotagging support.
 GPS with A-GPS function and Ovi Maps
 FM Radio 76.0–108 MHz with RDS (max. 20 stations).
 3.5 mm headphone / video-out jack and Nokia video-out cable CA-75U.
 MicroSDHC card slot (up to 16 GB) and 8GB card included in box (unofficial support up to 32 GB)
 Micro-USB 2.0 connector, Bluetooth 2.0 (EDR/A2DP/AVRCP) and Wireless LAN.
 Colours available – Black, Blue & Red

Keys and input method 
Stylus, plectrum and finger touch support for text input and user interface control (alphanumeric keypad, full and mini qwerty keyboard, handwriting recognition)
 Dedicated Media Bar touch key for access to music, gallery, share on-line, Video Centre and web browser
 Voice commands
 Physical keys for application launch key (menu key), send & end, power, camera, lock, volume up & down, slide unlock.

Software 
 Built-in support for Flash Lite 3.1.
 Java ME MIDP 2.0 included.
 Read-only trial version of QuickOffice is available, allowing to read MS Office/OpenOffice.org files, also supporting the Office Open XML file format.
 Adobe Reader LE trial version
 Ovi Maps
 Other s60v5 (*.sis) and Java (*.jar) software.
 Pre-installed Bounce Touch & Global Race: Raging Thunder Games

Firmware updates 
From firmware version 20.0.012 onwards, the 5800's CPU clock was increased from 369 MHz to 434 MHz, matching the N97 specification. However, improved overall performance can be observed since firmware version 30.

On 13 January 2010, Nokia released a major firmware update, version 40.0.005. The update includes bug fixes, speed improvements and new features. The most visible are kinetic scrolling to all menus (except the main and applications menus) and an improved home screen that was first introduced on the Nokia 5530. This software update also saw the removal of alphanumeric keypad in landscape view during text input, which was replaced by a full QWERTY keyboard. The new home screen provides a contacts carousel, with up to 20 contacts and program shortcuts on screen at the same time. There is a change on option selecting in every menus, but hard to notice; if one selects and holds on that selection, it will be in white, but normal colours when selecting an option is still being red like in v20.

On 19 April 2010, firmware version 50.0.005 was released. This new major update brought some new features available in Nokia N97, such as an upgrade to the existing web browser to version 7.2 and full kinetic scrolling and auto-full screen while browsing the web; a new music player with mini-album art in the song list and the album list, initial letter filtering of track titles in the music player while scrolling using the scroll-bar. As a result, the search function was removed from the music player. A new application called Ovi Sync was installed and the Nokia Music Store received a revamped user interface and was renamed to "Ovi Music". In some regions, Quick Office 4.2.374 is integrated with full free license. Search application's icon was changed and a few more minor updates for better touch sensitivity and tweaks for faster operation of the phone are present. And a little update to the color, the option you select is in silver, but when hold an option, it is still being white like v40. There is also the new feature, one-touch dialling.

Firmware 51.0.006 appeared in August 2010 and contained minor bug fixes and updates to various applications. RDS function, however, remains dysfunctional since version 40.0.005. The web browser has lost its ability to re-flow the text when the page is enlarged.

Firmware 51.2.007 was also released for North American Nokia 5800 RM-428 in August 2010 with the following changes:
This software release comes with an improved browser, improved video calls, and a new version of Mail for Exchange. There are also general performance improvements.
 Improved Mail for Exchange
 Improved video calls
 Improved browser
 Performance improvements

In November 2010, an updated firmware for Nokia 5800 was released for Nokia 5800 as V52.0.007. The firmware update expects
 Greater New Features
 Updated Application
 Performance improvements
 RDS function fix
There is still no "pencil" or "select several" ability in the gallery. A big disadvantage still exists as pictures and videos are listed in one gallery and there are no separate galleries for pictures and videos.

On 20 October 2011, firmware version 60.0.003 was released. This new major update brought the new Symbian Anna browser 7.3.1.33 and swipe to unlock feature.

See also 
 Mobile Java
 Nokia PC Suite
 Nokia Software Updater
 Qt (framework)
 RealPlayer
 Text-to-speech
 Wireless personal area network (WPAN)

References

External links 

 Nokia 5800 XpressMusic Product Page
 Nokia 5800 XpressMusic Complete Device Specifications 
 Nokia end-user support forum
 Nokia Device Manager

Nokia smartphones
Symbian devices
Portable media players
Handwriting recognition
S60 (software platform)
Digital audio players
Personal digital assistants
Devices capable of speech recognition
Mobile phones introduced in 2008